Soup is a primarily liquid food, generally served warm or hot (but may be cool or cold), that is made by combining ingredients of meat or vegetables with stock, milk, or water. Hot soups are additionally characterized by boiling solid ingredients in liquids in a pot until the flavors are extracted, forming a broth. Soups are similar to stews, and in some cases there may not be a clear distinction between the two; however, soups generally have more liquid (broth) than stews.

In traditional French cuisine, soups are classified into two main groups: clear soups and thick soups. The established French classifications of clear soups are bouillon and consommé. Thick soups are classified depending upon the type of thickening agent used: purées are vegetable soups thickened with starch; bisques are made from puréed shellfish or vegetables thickened with cream; cream soups may be thickened with béchamel sauce; and veloutés are thickened with eggs, butter, and cream. Other ingredients commonly used to thicken soups and broths include  rice, lentils, flour, and grains; many popular soups also include pumpkin, carrots, potatoes, pig's trotters and bird's nests.

Other types of soup include fruit soups, dessert soups, pulse soups like split pea, cold soups and other styles.

History

The earliest evidence for soup in human culinary practice dates to the Upper Palaeolithic period when thermally altered rocks became commonplace in the archaeological record. Small boiling pits are present on the Gravettian site Pavlov VI. Cobbles were heated on the hearth and then placed into the water to bring it to boil. However, the antiquity of soup is highly contested. Based on ethnographic evidence, some archaeologists conjecture that early humans employed hides and watertight baskets to boil water 

The word soup comes from French soupe ("soup", "broth"), which comes through Vulgar Latin suppa ("bread soaked in broth") from a Germanic source, from which also comes the word "sop", a piece of bread used to soak up soup or a thick stew.

The word restaurant (meaning "[something] restoring") was first used in France in the 16th century, to refer to a highly concentrated, inexpensive soup, sold by street vendors, that was advertised as an antidote to physical exhaustion. In 1765, a Parisian entrepreneur opened a shop specializing in such soups. This prompted the use of the modern word restaurant to refer to eating establishments.

In the US, the first colonial cookbook was published by William Parks in Williamsburg, Virginia, in 1742, based on Eliza Smith's The Compleat Housewife; or Accomplished Gentlewoman's Companion, and it included several recipes for soups and bisques. A 1772 cookbook, The Frugal Housewife, contained an entire chapter on the topic. English cooking dominated early colonial cooking; but as new immigrants arrived from other countries, other national soups gained popularity. In particular, German immigrants living in Pennsylvania were famous for their potato soups. In 1794, Jean Baptiste Gilbert Payplat dis Julien, a refugee from the French Revolution, opened an eating establishment in Boston called "The Restorator", and became known as the "Prince of Soups". The first American cooking pamphlet dedicated to soup recipes was written in 1882 by Emma Ewing: Soups and Soup Making.

Portable soup was devised in the 18th century by boiling seasoned meat until a thick, resinous syrup was left that could be dried and stored for months at a time.

Commercial products

Commercial soup became popular with the invention of canning in the 19th century, and today a great variety of canned and dried soups are on the market.

Canned
Canned soup can be condensed, in which case it is prepared by adding water (or sometimes milk) or it can be "ready-to-eat", meaning that no additional liquid is needed before eating. Condensed soup (invented in 1897 by John T. Dorrance, a chemist with the Campbell Soup Company) allows soup to be packaged into a smaller can and sold at a lower price than other canned soups. The "ready-to-eat" variant can be prepared by simply heating the contents of the can on a kitchen stove or in a microwave oven, rather than actually cooking anything. Such soups can be used as a base for homemade soups, with the consumer adding anything from a few vegetables to eggs, meat, cream or pasta.

Since the 1990s, the canned soup market has burgeoned, with non-condensed soups marketed as "ready-to-eat", so they require no additional liquid to prepare. Microwaveable bowls have expanded the "ready-to-eat" canned soup market even more, offering convenience (especially in workplaces), and making for popular lunch items. In response to concerns over the negative health effects of excessive salt intake, some soup manufacturers have introduced reduced-salt versions of popular soups.

Today, Campbell's Tomato (introduced in 1897), Cream of Mushroom, and Chicken Noodle (introduced in 1934) are three of the most popular soups in America. Americans consume approximately 2.5 billion bowls of these three soups alone each year. Other popular brands of soup include Progresso.

Dried

Dry soup mixes are sold by many manufacturers, and are reconstituted with hot water; other fresh ingredients may then be added.

The first dried soup was bouillon cubes; the earlier meat extract did not require refrigeration, but was a viscous liquid.

East Asian-style instant noodle soups include ramen and seasonings, and are marketed as a convenient and inexpensive instant meal, requiring only hot water for preparation. While North American ones tend to have a powder pack only, instant noodles sold in East Asia commonly include a pack of dried vegetables too.

Western-style dried soups include vegetable, chicken base, potato, pasta and cheese flavors.

Types

In French cuisine, soup is often served before other dishes in a meal. In 1970, Richard Olney gave the place of the entrée in a French full menu: "A dinner that begins with a soup and runs through a fish course, an entrée, a sorbet, a roast, salad, cheese and dessert, and that may be accompanied by from three to six wines, presents a special problem of orchestration".

Dessert
 Chè, a Vietnamese cold dessert soup containing sugar and coconut milk, with many different varieties of other ingredients including taro, cassava, adzuki bean, mung bean, jackfruit, and durian.
 Ginataan, Filipino soup made from coconut milk, fruits and tapioca pearls, served hot or cold
 Shiruko, a Japanese azuki bean soup
 Tong sui, a collective term for Chinese sweet soups
 Sawine, a soup made with milk, spices, parched vermicelli, almonds and dried fruits, served during the Muslim festival of Eid ul-Fitr in Trinidad and Tobago
 Chinese dessert soups include douhua and black sesame soup

Fruit

Fruit soups are prepared using fruit as a primary ingredient, and may be served warm or cold depending on the recipe. Many varieties of fruit soups exist, and they may be prepared based upon the availability of seasonal fruit.

Cold

Cold soups are a particular variation on the traditional soup, wherein the temperature when served is kept at or below room temperature. They may be sweet or savory. In summer, sweet cold soups can form part of a dessert tray. An example of a savory chilled soup is gazpacho, a chilled vegetable-based soup originating from Spain. Vichyssoise is a cold purée of potatoes, leeks, and cream.

Asian

A feature of East Asian soups not normally found in Western cuisine is the use of tofu in soups. Many traditional East Asian soups are typically broths, "clear soups", or starch thickened soups.

Traditional regional varieties

 Aguadito is a green soup from Peru, when prepared with chicken, it is called aguadito de pollo. It also includes cilantro, carrot, peas, potatoes, ají amarillo, other meat like hen, mussels or fish, it can alleviate hangover.
 Asopao is a rice soup very popular in Puerto Rico. When prepared with chicken, it is referred to as asopao de pollo.
 Ajiaco is a chicken soup from Colombia.
 Avgolemono is a Greek chicken soup with lemon and egg. It is also prepared as a sauce.
 Bánh canh is a Vietnamese udon noodle soup, popular variants include bánh canh cua (crab udon soup), bánh canh chả cá (fish cake udon soup)
 Bird's nest soup is a delicacy in Chinese cuisine.
 Bisque is a thick, creamy, highly seasoned soup, classically of pureed crustaceans, of French origin.
 Borscht is a beet-vegetable soup: originally for Eastern Europe beetroots with cabbage  from Ukraine and beetroots with mushrooms from Poland.
 Bouillabaisse is a fish soup from Marseille, is also made in other Mediterranean regions; in Catalonia it is called bullebesa.
 Bourou-bourou is a vegetable and pasta soup from the island of Corfu, Greece.
 Bún bò Huế is a spicy lemongrass-flavored beef noodle soup from Huế, Central Vietnam, topped with fresh herbs, sliced onions and shallots and other crunchy toppings like pork rind
 Caldo verde is a Portuguese minced kale soup
 Callaloo is a thick, creamy soup made with okra, spinach and, often, crab meat from Trinidad and Tobago 
 Canh chua – (sour soup) made with rice, fish, various vegetables, and in some cases pineapple is from Vietnam.
 Canja de galinha is a Portuguese soup of chicken, rice and lemon.
 Cazuela is a Chilean soup of medium thick flavoured stock obtained from cooking several kinds of meats and vegetables mixed together.
 Clam chowder is found in two major types, New England clam chowder, made with potatoes and cream, and Manhattan clam chowder, made with a tomato base.
 Cock-a-leekie soup is leek and potato soup made with chicken stock, from Scotland.
 Cullen skink, also from Scotland, is a fish soup made with smoked haddock, potatoes, onions and cream.
 Egg drop soup, a savory Chinese soup, is made by adding already-beaten eggs into boiling water or broth.
 Egusi soup, a traditional soup from Nigeria, is made with vegetables, meat, fish, and balls of ground melon seed. It is often eaten with fufu.
 Etrog is a fruit soup made from the citron used in Jewish rituals at the feast of Succoth, is eaten by Ashkenazi Jews at Tu Bishvat.
 Ezogelin soup is a traditional Turkish variety of lentil soup, also very common in Turkey.
 Faki soupa is a Greek lentil soup, with carrots, olive oil, herbs and possibly tomato sauce or vinegar.
 Fanesca is a traditional cod soup from Ecuador.
 Fasolada is a traditional Greek bean soup.
 French onion soup is a clear soup made with beef broth and sautéed (caramelized) onions.
 Garbure is a traditional dish in Gascony (southwest France), midway between a soup and a stew.
 Gazpacho (from Spain and Portugal) is a savory soup based on tomato.
 Goulash is a Hungarian soup of beef, paprika and onion.
 Gumbo is a traditional Creole soup from the Southern United States. It is thickened with okra pods, roux and sometimes filé powder.
 Halászlé (fisherman's soup), a very hot and spicy Hungarian river fish soup, is made with hot paprika.
  is a traditional Icelandic meat soup made with lamb and vegetables.
 Kharcho is a Georgian soup of lamb, rice, vegetables and a highly spiced bouillon.
 Kulajda is a Czech sour cream soup.
 Kuyteav is a Cambodian rice noodle soup with pork stock and various toppings.
 Kyselo is a traditional Bohemian (Krkonoše region) sour soup made from sourdough, mushrooms, cumin, potatoes and scrambled eggs.
 Laghman – a tradition in Uzbekistan, is made with pasta, vegetables, ground lamb and numerous spices.
 Lan Sikik is a Thai soup made with noodles, dried fish and tomato extract.
 Leek soup is a simple soup made from leeks, is popular in Wales during Saint David's Day.
 Lentil soup is popular in Middle Eastern and Mediterranean cuisines.
 London particular is a thick soup of pureed (dry or split) peas and ham from England; purportedly it is named after the thick fogs of 19th-century London.
 Magiritsa soup is made in Greece and Cyprus using lamb offal.
 Maryland crab soup is made of vegetables, blue crab meat, and Old Bay Seasoning in a tomato base, from Maryland.
 Menudo is a traditional Mexican soup, is with tripe (usually beef) and hominy.
 Michigan bean soup has been a staple for over a hundred years in the U.S. Senate dining room in the form of Senate bean soup.
 Minestrone is an Italian vegetable soup.
 Miso soup is made from fish broth and fermented soy in Japan.
 Mulligatawny is an Anglo-Indian curried soup.
 Nässelsoppa (nettle soup) is made with stinging nettles, and traditionally eaten with hard boiled egg halves, is considered a spring delicacy in Sweden.
 Nkatenkwan is a heavily spiced soup from Ghana based on groundnut with meat, most often chicken, and vegetables added. It is generally eaten with fufu.
 Noodle soup is the common name for a diverse collection of soups with varied ingredients, including noodles.
 Okroshka is a cold soup of Russian origin.
 Partan bree is a Scottish soup made with crabmeat and rice.
 Patsás is made with tripe in Greece. It is also cooked in Turkey and the Balkan Peninsula.
 "Peasants' soup" is a catch-all term for soup made by combining a diverse—and often eclectic—assortment of ingredients. Variations on peasants' soup are popular in Eastern Europe, Russia, and Central Africa.
 Philadelphia pepper pot soup is a Philadelphia specialty, is traditionally made with tripe.
 Phở is Vietnamese beef or chicken soup with scallions, welsh onion, charred ginger, wild coriander (Eryngium foetidum), basil, cinnamon, star anise, clove and black cardamom.
 Psarosoupa is a Greek fish soup, is made in various versions with a variety of fish types.
 Rasam is a South Indian traditional soup prepared using tamarind, pepper, cumin and steamed lentils.
 Revithia is a Greek chickpea soup.
 Sancocho is chicken soup with vegetables in Latin America.
 Scotch broth is made from mutton or lamb, barley and root vegetables.
 Shchav is a sorrel soup in Polish, Russian and Yiddish cuisines, is sour from the sorrel.
 Shchi is a Russian soup with cabbage as the primary ingredient.
 She-crab soup is from Charleston, South Carolina, and is a creamy soup made with blue crab meat and crab roe.
 Sinigang, from the Philippines, is a clear sour soup made from tamarind paste and meat, fish, or vegetables.
 Snert (erwtensoep) is a thick pea soup, is eaten in the Netherlands as a winter dish, and is traditionally served with sliced sausage.
 Solyanka – Russian soup on a meat, fish or vegetable broth with pickles, spices and smoked meat or fish.
 Sopa da Pedra is a rich traditional Portuguese soup with many ingredients.
 Sopa de Peixe is a traditional Portuguese fish soup.
 Soto is a traditional Indonesian soup made with turmeric, galangal, etc., usually contains either beef or chicken.
 Svartsoppa is a traditional Swedish soup, whose main ingredient is goose and, sometimes, pig's blood, and is made in Skåne, the southernmost region of Sweden. The other ingredients typically include vinegar, port wine or cognac and spices such as cloves, ginger and allspice. The soup is served warm with boiled pieces of apple and plums, goose liver sausage and the boiled innards of the goose. 
 Split pea soup is a thick soup made in the Caribbean from split peas (chickpeas or garbanzos), usually includes "ground provision" vegetable staples and some type of meat.
 Tarator is a Bulgarian cold soup made from yogurt and cucumbers.
 Thukpa bhatuk is a Tibetan cuisine noodle soup which centers on little hand-rolled bhatsa noodles.
 Tomato soup comes in several varieties, with tomatoes in common.
 Tom yum is the name for two similar hot and sour soups with fragrant herbs from Laos and Thailand.
 Tarhana soup is from Persian cuisine, and is made with fermented grains and yogurt.
 Trahanas is a variation of the above soup using chicken and Halloumi cheese
 Ukha is a Russian fish soup, sometimes eaten with pirog.
 Vichyssoise, a French-style soup invented by a French chef at the Ritz Hotel in New York City, is a cold purée of potatoes, leeks, and cream.
 Waterzooi is a Belgian fish soup.
 Yukgaejang is a Korean spicy beef soup, also includes vegetables.
 Żurek is a Polish sour rye soup with sausages, is often served in a bowl made of bread.
 Ärtsoppa is a Swedish split pea soup, served with mustard and fresh marjoram or thyme. It is traditionally eaten as lunch on Thursdays. It is served together with Swedish punsch as beverage and Swedish pancakes with preserved berries for dessert.

As a figure of speech

In the English language, the word soup has developed several uses in phrase.
 Alphabet soup, a large number of acronyms used by an administration; the term has its roots in a common tomato-based soup containing pasta shaped in the letters of the alphabet
 Duck soup, a simple soup, stands for a task that is particularly easy
 "From soup to nuts" means "from beginning to end", referring to the traditional position of soup as the first course in a multi-course meal
 "In the soup" refers to being in a bad situation
 Pea soup fog, a type of very thick fog caused by air pollution, heavily associated with London
 Primordial soup, the organic mixture leading to the development of life
 Soup kitchen, a place that serves prepared food of any kind to the homeless or needy
 Stone soup, a popular children's fable about a poor man who encourages villagers to share their food with him by telling them that he can make soup with a stone
 Souperism, the practice of bible societies during the Irish Great Famine to feed the hungry in exchange for religious instruction. The expression 'took the soup' is used to refer to those who converted from Catholicism to Protestantism at the behest of these organizations in return for food
 Tag soup, poorly coded HTML

The direct translation for soup in the Filipino language, sabaw, is used as a figure of speech, referring to moments where one is unable to think straight, as if one's brain is empty, much like a bowl of soup devoid of any ingredients. It can also refer to someone who says something that makes no sense, thereby referring to them as sabog.

Gallery

See also

 Instant soup
 List of foods
 List of soups
 List of bean soups
 List of cold soups
 List of fish and seafood soups
 Soup and sandwich
 Three grand soups

References

Further reading

 Fernandez-Armesto, Felipe. Near a Thousand Tables: A History of Food (2002). New York: Free Press 
 Larousse Gastronomique, Jennifer Harvey Lang, ed. American Edition (1988). New York: Crown Publishers 
 Morton, Mark. Cupboard Love: A Dictionary of Culinary Curiosities'' (2004). Toronto: Insomniac Press 
 

 
World cuisine
Ancient dishes
Types of food